After the action at Lanark, William Wallace joined forces with William Douglas the Hardy and led a raid on the city of Scone. He and his men forced William de Ormesby, the English-appointed Justice of Scotland, to flee, and took control. After this, Douglas was captured, but Wallace continued to capture land for Scotland, and then moved on to win the Battle of Stirling Bridge.

References

Conflicts in 1297
1297 in Scotland
Battles between England and Scotland
Battles of the Wars of Scottish Independence
Military raids
13th-century military history of Scotland
13th-century military history of the Kingdom of England